Athletics at the 2015 CPISRA World Games were held during the last 3 days of the games, from 13 to 15 August 2015, at the Harvey Hadden Stadium. The sport of athletics in the 2015 CPISRA World Games was split into three distinct sets of events: track and field events and Racerunning events.

Overview

Results

Seated Discus Female/Male
13/08/15 - F1 - 10.15am: F32/33/34 Seated Discus Female/Male

Ambulant Shot Female
13/08/15 - F2 - 10.45am: F35/36/37/38 Ambulant Shot Female

Seated Javelin Female/Male
13/08/15 - F3 - 2.00pm: F33/34 Seated Javelin Female/Male

Ambulant Discus Male
13/08/15 - F4 - 2.15pm: F35/36/37/38 Ambulant Discus Male

Ambulant Javelin Female
13/08/15 - F5 - 3.30pm: F35/36/37 Ambulant Javelin Female

Ambulant Long Jump Male
14/08/15 - F6 - 10.30am: F35/36/37/38 Ambulant Long Jump Male

Ambulant Long Jump Pentathlon Female

Seated Club Female/Male
14/08/15 - F7 - 11.00am: F31/32 Seated Club Female/Male

Ambulant Long Jump Female
14/08/15 - F8 - 11.30am: F35/36/37/38 Ambulant Long Jump Female

Shot Put Pentathlon Female
14/08/15 - F9 - 12.15pm: F38 Shot Put Pentathlon Female

Ambulant Javelin Male
14/08/15 - F10 - 2.00pm: F35/36/37/38 Ambulant Javelin Male

Discus Pentathlon Female
14/08/15 - F11 - 3.00pm: F38 Discus Pentathlon Female

Seated Shot Female/Male
14/08/15 - F12 - 3.00pm: F32/33/34 Seated Shot Female/Male

Ambulant Discus Female
15/08/15 - F13 - 10.30am: F35/F36/37/38 Ambulant Discus Female

Ambulant Shot Male
15/08/15 - F14 - 11.15am: F35/36 Ambulant Shot Male

15/08/15 - F15 - 2.30pm: F37/F38 Ambulant Shot Male

100m Wheelchair Female
13/08/15 - T1 - 10.15am: 100m T33/T34 Wheelchair Female

800m RaceRunning Female

13/08/15 - T2 - 10.30am: 800m RR1/2/3 Female

800m Ambulant Female
13/08/15 - T3 - 11.00am: 800m T36 Ambulant Female

no competition

800m RaceRunning Male
13/08/15 - T4 - 11.30am: 800m RR1/2/3 Male

800m Wheelchair Male
13/08/15 - T5 - 12.00pm: 800m T33/T34 Wheelchair Male

800m Ambulant Male
13/08/15 - T6 - 12.15pm: 800m T35/36/37/38 Ambulant Male

400m RaceRunning Female

13/08/15 - T7 - 2.00pm: 400m RR1/2/3 Female

400m Wheelchair Female
13/08/15 - T8 - 2.15pm: 400m T33/T34 Wheelchair Female

400m Ambulant Female
13/08/15 - T9 - 2.30pm: 400m T35/36/37/38 Ambulant Female

400m RaceRunning Male
13/08/15 - T10 - 2.45pm: 400m RR1 RaceRunning Male

13/08/15 - T11 - 3.00pm: 400m RR2/3 RaceRunning Male

400m Wheelchair Male
13/08/15 - T12 - 3.15pm:400m T33/T34 Wheelchair Male

400m Ambulant Male
13/08/15 - T13 - 3.30pm: 400m T35/36 Ambulant Male

13/08/15 - T14 - 3.45pm: 400m T37 Ambulant Male

13/08/15 - T15 - 4.00pm: 400m T38 Ambulant Male

800m Wheelchair Female
14/08/15 - T16 - 10.30am: 800m T33/T34 Wheelchair Female

3000m Ambulant Female/Male
14/08/15 - T17 - 11.00am: 3000m T36/37/38 Ambulant Female/Male

200m Ambulant Male
14/08/15 - T18 - 11.45am: 200m T35/36 Ambulant Male

14/08/15 - T19 - 12.00pm: 200m T37 Ambulant Male

14/08/15 - T20 - 12.15pm: 200m T38 Ambulant Male

100m Pentathlon Female
14/08/15 - T21 - 1.45pm: 100m F38 Pentathlon Female

200m RaceRunning Female
14/08/15 - T22 - 2.15pm: 200m RR1/2/3 RaceRunning Female

200m Wheelchair Female
14/08/15 - T23 - 2.30pm: 200m T33/T34 Wheelchair Female

200m Ambulant Female
14/08/15 - T24 - 2.45pm: 200m T35/36 Ambulant Female

14/08/15 - T25 - 3.00pm: 200m T37/38 Ambulant Female

200m RaceRunning Male
14/08/15 - T26 - 3.15pm: 200m RR1 RaceRunning Male

14/08/15 - T27 - 3.30pm: 200m RR2/3 RaceRunning Male

200m Wheelchair Male
14/08/15 - T28 - 3.45pm: 200m T33/T34 Wheelchair Male

800m Pentathlon Female
14/08/15 - T29 - 4.00pm: 800m F38 Pentathlon Female

5000m Ambulant Male
14/08/15 - T30 - 4.15pm: 5000m F38 Ambulant Male

1500m RaceRunning Male
15/08/15 - T31 - 10.30am: 1500m RR2/3 Male

1500m Wheelchair Female/Male
15/08/15 - T32 - 11.00am: 1500m T33 Wheelchair Female/Male

no competition

15/08/15 - T33 - 11.00am: 1500m T33 Wheelchair Female/Male

15/08/15 - T33 - 11.15am: 1500m T34 Wheelchair Female/Male

1500m Ambulant Male
15/08/15 - T34 - 11.30am: 1500m T35/36/37/38 Ambulant Male

100m RaceRunning Female
15/08/15 - T35 - 11.45am: 100m RR1/2/3 RaceRunning Female

100m RaceRunning Male
15/08/15 - T36 - 12.00noon: 100m RR1 RaceRunning Male

15/08/15 - T37 - 2.00pm: 100m RR2/3 RaceRunning Male

100m Ambulant Female
15/08/15 - T38 - 2.10pm: 100m T35/36 Ambulant Female

15/08/15 - T39 - 2.20pm: 100m T37/38 Ambulant Female

100m Wheelchair Male
15/08/15 - T40 - 2.30pm: 100m T33/34 Wheelchair Male

100m Ambulant Male
15/08/15 - T41 - 2.45pm: 100m T35/36 Ambulant Male

15/08/15 - T42 - 3.00pm: 100m T37 Ambulant Male

Ambulant Relay Female/Male
15/08/15 - T43+T44 - 3.30pm: Ambulant Relay Female/Male

See also

References

External links
 CPISRA World Games Nottingham 2015
 CPISRA World Games 2015 Results Final (pdf)
 Cerebral Palsy International Sports & Recreation Association (CPISRA)
 International Federation of Cerebral Palsy Football (IFCPF)

CPISRA World Games
2015 CPISRA World Games
Athletics at the Cerebral Palsy Games